Colin Mills is a professorial fellow in sociology at Nuffield College, University of Oxford. Mills has research interests in social inequality, social mobility, social demography, historical social mobility, and social measurement. He was editor in chief of the British Journal of Sociology from 2007 to 2008. Mills had previously served as associate editor of the journal for seven years until 2003, when Stephen Hill was chief editor.

Selected publications
Colin Mills (2014)  'Do adult obesity rates in England really vary by insecurity as well as by inequality?' BMJ Open
Colin Mills (2014) 'Mapping Social Class in Britain', Sociology Review, 24, 2, 20-23
John Hills, Mike Brewer, Stephen Jenkins, Ruth Lister, Ruth Lupton, Stephen Machin, Colin Mills, Tariq Modood, Teresa Ress and Sheila Riddell (2011) An anatomy of economic inequality in the UK: Report of the National Equality Panel
Patrick McGovern, Stephen Hill, Colin Mills and Michael White (2007) Market, Class and Employment, Oxford University Press
Colin Mills (2006) "Mobility" in John Scott (ed.) Sociology: The Key Concepts, Routledge

References 

Fellows of Nuffield College, Oxford
Academics of the University of Oxford
Living people
Year of birth missing (living people)
British sociologists
Academic journal editors